Sarti is a village in Dhar Kalan in Gurdaspur district of Punjab State, India. The village is administrated by Sarpanch an elected representative of the village.

Demography 
, The village has a total number of 769 houses and the population of 3960 of which 2023 are males while 1937 are females according to the report published by Census India in 2011. The literacy rate of the village is 76%, highest than the state average of 75.84%. The population of children under the age of 6 years is 498 which is 12.58% of total population of the village, and child sex ratio is approximately 957 highest than the state average of 846.

Most of the people are from Schedule Caste which constitutes 31.29% of total population in the village. The town does not have any Schedule Tribe population so far.

As per census 2011, 1473 people were engaged in work activities out of the total population of the village which includes 1086 males and 387 females. According to census survey report 2011, 51.19% workers describe their work as main work and 48.81% workers are involved in marginal activity providing the livelihood for less than 6 months.

Transport 

See also
List of villages in India

References 

Villages in Gurdaspur district